Thanet may refer to:

Isle of Thanet, a former island, now a peninsula, at the most easterly point of Kent, England
Thanet District, a local government district containing the island
Thanet College, former name of East Kent College
Thanet Canal, a short branch of the Leeds and Liverpool Canal
Earl of Thanet, a title in the Peerage of England created in 1628
Thanet Formation, a geological formation found in the London Basin of southeastern England
 HMS Thanet (H29), an S-class destroyer of the Royal Navy

See also
Thanetian, in the ICS Geologic timescale, the latest age or uppermost stratigraphic stage of the Paleocene Epoch